Luis Alfonso Domínguez Guíñez (18 December 1916 in Santiago, Chile – 23 April 1973) was a Chilean footballer. He played as a forward. He was also part of Chile's squad for the 1939 South American Championship.

Teams
  Badmintón 1937
  Unión Española 1937–1938
  Colo Colo 1939–1943
  Universidad de Chile 1943
  Colo Colo 1944–1947

Titles
  Colo Colo 1939, 1941, 1944 and 1947 (Primera División), 1940 (Copa Apertura), 1945 (Champions Championship)

Honours
  Colo Colo 1939 and 1944 (Top Scorer Chilean Primera División Championship)

Notes

References

External links
 

1916 births
1973 deaths
Chilean footballers
Association football forwards
Chile international footballers
Colo-Colo footballers
Badminton F.C. footballers
Unión Española footballers
Universidad de Chile footballers
Chilean Primera División players
Footballers from Santiago